Ieva Žukauskaitė-Sodeikienė (born 24 January 1990) is a Lithuanian ballroom dancer. She is currently dancing with her partner Evaldas Sodeika and competing in the non-professional division.

In the 2014 World Amateur Championships Sodeika/Sodeikienė won bronze medals. During the 2015 European Amateur Championships two Lithuanian amateur couples reached the final for the first time (Sodeika/Sodeikienė and Lacitis/Golodneva). Sodeika and Sodeikienė ended up winning bronze medals.

In 2017, Sodeikienė represented Lithuania in the 2017 World Games and she won the bronze medal in Standard.

References 
Ieva Žukauskaitė at WDSF

Lithuanian ballroom dancers
Living people
Lithuanian female dancers
1990 births
World Games gold medalists
World Games bronze medalists
Competitors at the 2017 World Games
Competitors at the 2022 World Games
20th-century Lithuanian women
21st-century Lithuanian women